U.S. Route 24 (US 24) in the U.S. state of Illinois is a major arterial road that runs from the Missouri state line at the Mississippi River in Quincy to Sheldon.

Route description

Quincy to East Peoria
From Quincy to Peoria, the US 24 route follows the old Peoria to Quincy stage coach route.

The US 24 crossing into Illinois from Missouri over the Mississippi River consists of two bridges; westbound traffic uses the newer Bayview Bridge, while eastbound traffic uses the Quincy Memorial Bridge. At the eastern end of the Quincy Memorial Bridge, eastbound US 24 overlaps Illinois Route 57 (IL 57) northbound (4th Street) for two blocks before IL 57 ends at IL 104 (Broadway); westbound US 24 turns off onto the bridge at the northern terminus of IL 57. US 24 continues north at IL 104 and serves only the northwestern portion of Quincy.

US 24 overlaps IL 96 briefly before running due east. It has a full interchange with the northern terminus of Interstate 172 (I-172) ; as of 2006, IL 336 continues northbound of I-172.

US 24 then proceeds through a series of small towns; east of Camp Point, it intersects the southern terminus of IL 94. In Mount Sterling it briefly overlaps IL 99; IL 107 ends just south of US 24. At this point, the highway turns northeast once again.

Just outside Ripley US 24 intersects the western terminus of IL 103. US 24 then intersects US 67 outside of Rushville. It enters Rushville from the west and exits north, on Kinderhook Road.

US 24 continues northeast and follows a series of concurrencies. West of Havana, US 24 joins IL 100 northbound, and US 136 westbound, forming a wrong-way concurrency. US 136 leaves US 24 and travels west at Duncan Mills, while US 24 and IL 100 continue north to Lewistown. In Lewistown, the US 24/IL 100 combination intersects IL 97 (Avenue E). IL 97/IL 100 run north while US 24 eastbound joins with IL 97 southbound. US 24/IL 97 meets IL 78, where IL 78/IL 97 runs southbound and US 24 eastbound joins with IL 78 northbound. The series of concurrencies ends in Little America, where IL 78 turns north and US 24 continues northeast.

IL 9 overlaps US 24 from Banner, through Kingston Mines and Mapleton, to where IL 9 splits and crosses the river to Pekin.

North of the Pekin turnoff, US 24 enters Bartonville as South Adams Street.  Where Adams Street climbs a hill, US 24 splits off onto McKinley Avenue, rejoining Adams Street just south of the I-474 interchange. 

Just before it enters the south side of Peoria, US 24 turns southeast onto I-474 to cross the Shade–Lohmann Bridge. Previously, US 24 ran concurrently with US 150 across the McClugage Bridge upstream, crossing into East Peoria; when it was realigned to the current routing, the section through Peoria was decommissioned.

US 24 leaves I-474 after three miles and enters Creve Coeur with IL 29 northbound as South Main Street.

East Peoria to Eureka
US 24/IL 29 enters East Peoria just south of the IL 8/IL 116 westbound interchange. US 24/IL 29 joins IL 8/IL 116 eastbound at the foot of the left connector ramp, and then continues north. 

In East Peoria, US 24 follows another series of concurrencies. At Camp Street, US 24/IL 29/IL 116 join US 150 westbound, forming a wrong-way concurrency. IL 8 splits from US 24 and travels east-northeast, along with US 150 eastbound. Just after crossing Camp Street, US 24/US 150/IL 29/IL 116 have an interchange with I-74. IL 29 splits onto I-74 westbound to cross the river to Peoria, while US 24/US 150/IL 116 continue northeast. This series of concurrencies ends at the interchange on the north side of East Peoria, where IL 116 continues northeast, US 150 crosses the Illinois River on the McClugage Bridge, and US 24 turns to the east.

The highway continues past Illinois Central College to the interchange of Business US 24 and the eastern terminus of IL 8, (Business US 24 and IL 8 form an unsigned wrong-way concurrency at this point). Business US 24 continues to Washington's town square on a four-lane undivided surface road, which eventually narrows to a two-lane road; the US 24 bypass remains four lanes divided to Main Street north of Washington. The eastern terminus of Business US 24 is near Eureka.

Eureka to Indiana
In Eureka, US 24 has a stoplight with IL 117; there are also numerous signs to Eureka College and the Ronald Reagan Trail, as Eureka had prominence in President Ronald Reagan's early life. US 24 then continues east, bypassing Secor to the south before meeting with I-39.

Just east of I-39, US 24 serves as the main east–west road through El Paso, which largely serves as a stop for travelers on I-39. US 24 travels through one other community, Gridley before having an interchange with I-55 west of Chenoa.

East of I-55, US 24 has an intersection with former US 66. It then passes through the towns of Fairbury, Forrest and Chatsworth, intersecting Illinois Route 47 in Forrest. Just south of Gilman, US 24 has an interchange with I-57 before overlapping US 45 through Gilman. The two highways separate east of Gilman.

In Crescent City US 24 intersects IL 49. In Watseka, it overlaps IL 1 through the town; the final concurrency, with US 52 in Sheldon carries into Indiana.

History
The routing of US 24 in Illinois is largely unchanged from 1926. Prior to 1937, US 24 ran through Canton on various roads; afterwards it was relocated southeast, closely paralleling the Illinois River.

In 1995 a bypass around Washington was completed. The old US 24 became an extension of IL 8 to near Eureka. In 1997, it was changed to Business US 24, and IL 8 was truncated back to west of Washington.

Prior to 2012, US 24 ran through Peoria via downtown on various roads. That year, it was rerouted from the McClugage Bridge to the Shade–Lohmann Bridge on the border of Bartonville and Peoria, which carries I-474.  

Since the 1950s, US 24 through Illinois and Missouri has been considered as one route of various Chicago to Kansas City federal Interstate proposals (1956, 1968, 1972). None of these proposals received federal funding or support.

Major intersections

See also

References

 Illinois
24
Transportation in Adams County, Illinois
Transportation in Brown County, Illinois
Transportation in Schuyler County, Illinois
Transportation in Fulton County, Illinois
Transportation in Peoria County, Illinois
Transportation in Tazewell County, Illinois
Transportation in Woodford County, Illinois
Transportation in McLean County, Illinois
Transportation in Livingston County, Illinois
Transportation in Ford County, Illinois
Transportation in Iroquois County, Illinois